The 2017–18 Elon Phoenix women's basketball team represents Elon University during the 2017–18 NCAA Division I women's basketball season. The Phoenix, led by seventh year head coach Charlotte Smith, play their home games at Alumni Gym and were members of the Colonial Athletic Association (CAA). They finished the season 25–8, 14–4 in CAA play to finish in third place. They also won the CAA Tournament Championship for the second straight year and earned an automatic bid to the NCAA women's basketball tournament. They lost in the first round to NC State.

This season was the last for the Phoenix at Alumni Gym, with the new Schar Center scheduled to open for the 2018 women's volleyball season (which precedes the basketball season within the school year).

Roster

Schedule

|-
!colspan=9 style=| Exhibition

|-
!colspan=9 style=| Non-conference regular season

|-
!colspan=9 style=| CAA regular season

|-
!colspan=9 style=| CAA Women's Tournament

|-
!colspan=9 style=| NCAA Women's Tournament

Rankings
2017–18 NCAA Division I women's basketball rankings

See also 
2017–18 Elon Phoenix men's basketball team

References 

Elon Phoenix women's basketball seasons
Elon
Elon